Eilema phaeopera is a moth of the subfamily Arctiinae. It was described by George Hampson in 1900. It is found in Mozambique and South Africa.

References

 

phaeopera
Moths described in 1900
Moths of Sub-Saharan Africa
Lepidoptera of Mozambique
Lepidoptera of South Africa